Audrey Dufeu-Schubert (born 3 June 1980) is a French politician of La République En Marche! (LREM) who has been serving as a member of the French National Assembly since 18 June 2017, representing the 8th constituency of the department of Loire-Atlantique.

Political career
In parliament, Dufeu-Schubert serves as member of the Committee on Social Affairs. In addition to her committee assignments, she chairs the French-Danish Parliamentary Friendship Group.

Political positions
In July 2019, Dufeu-Schubert voted in favor of the French ratification of the European Union’s Comprehensive Economic and Trade Agreement (CETA) with Canada.

See also
 2017 French legislative election

References

1980 births
Living people
Deputies of the 15th National Assembly of the French Fifth Republic
La République En Marche! politicians
21st-century French women politicians
Place of birth missing (living people)
Women members of the National Assembly (France)
Members of Parliament for Loire-Atlantique